Lithocarpus edulis, the Japanese stone oak, is a species of stone-oak native to Japan. It is an evergreen tree growing up to 15 metres tall. The nuts are edible for people but taste bitter. The nuts contain tannins, however soaking them in water removes them. It is cultivated as an ornamental plant.

References

The Plant List

External links
 Lithocarpus edulis database
 Lithocarpus edulis picture

edulis
Trees of Japan
Endemic flora of Japan